John McLoughlin (1784–1857) was a Canadian fur trader and Oregon pioneer.

John McLoughlin may also refer to:
John McLoughlin (Proctor), a 1953 bronze sculpture of John McLoughlin by Alexander Phimister Proctor 
John McLoughlin (police officer) (born c. 1953), 9/11 attacks survivor
John McLoughlin Jr. (1812–1842), Metis Chief Trader employed by the Hudson's Bay Company
John McLaughlin (performance artist) (1956–1990), New York City performance artist, singer, and parodist, known as John Sex

See also
John McLoughlin Bridge (built in 1933) in Oregon, US
John McLoughlin House (built in 1845) in Oregon, US
John McLaughlin (disambiguation)
John MacLoughlin (1871–1943), Irish politician
John MacLaughlin (disambiguation)
John Loughlin (disambiguation)